"Makin' Love" is a song by Floyd Robinson.

Makin' Love may also refer to:

Songs 
 "Makin' Love", by Kiss, from the album Rock and Roll Over
 "Makin' Love", by Rainbow, from the album Down to Earth

See also 
 Feel Like Makin' Love (disambiguation)